The men's Greco-Roman 66 kilograms is a competition featured at the 2009 World Wrestling Championships; it was held at the Messecenter Herning exhibition center in Herning, Denmark on September 27.

Results
Legend
F — Won by fall
R — Retired

Finals

Top half

Section 1

Section 2

Bottom half

Section 3

Section 4

Repechage

References
Results Book, Pages 121–122

Men's Greco-Roman 66 kg